State Road 236 (NM 236) is a  state highway in the US state of New Mexico. NM 236's western terminus is at NM 267 south of Melrose, and the eastern terminus is at NM 267 in Portales.

Major intersections

See also

References

236
Transportation in Roosevelt County, New Mexico